The Palace Theatre is a historic building located at 125 Jimmy Davis Boulevard in Jonesboro, Louisiana. 

Built before 1924 as a brick building, it was remodelled with a stucco facade and in 1929.  The renovation included a mixture of Art Deco and Spanish Colonial Revival styling.

It was deemed notable "as the only professional entertainment venue in Jonesboro, the seat of Jackson Parish" and "as one of the parish’s very limited number of architectural landmarks."

The theatre was listed on the National Register of Historic Places on July 30, 2008.

See also
National Register of Historic Places listings in Jackson Parish, Louisiana

References

National Register of Historic Places in Louisiana
Mission Revival architecture in Louisiana
Art Deco architecture in Louisiana
Buildings and structures completed in 1929
Jackson Parish, Louisiana